Frank Crockett was a Negro league outfielder between 1916 and 1923.

Crockett made his Negro leagues debut in 1916 with the Bacharach Giants. He played for the Brooklyn Royal Giants in 1918, and returned to the Bacharach club in 1921, 1922 and 1923.

References

External links
 and Baseball-Reference Black Baseball stats and Seamheads

Place of birth missing
Place of death missing
Year of birth missing
Year of death missing
Bacharach Giants players
Brooklyn Royal Giants players
Baseball outfielders